Klar Tale (Clear Speech) is Norway's only easy-to-read newspaper. The newspaper tries to make the news understandable to all. The language is simple and the print is larger than in other newspapers. 

Klar Tale is published every week, with 12 pages of news and other current material from Norway and the world. The newspaper also has a Braille edition, is recorded on CD, and is available as a podcast.

The company Mediehuset has editorial responsibility for the newspaper. Klar Tale is religiously and politically independent. Its editor is Kristin Steien Bratlie.

History
The first issue of Klar Tale was released on 11 October 1990 in partnership between the Norwegian News Agency (NTB) and the newspaper Indre Smaalenenes Avis as an experiment that would last two years. Two journalists from NTB, Kari Lindebrække and Anne Kari Berg, would act as editors, with Hans Erik Matre of NTB acting as chief editor. Indre would print and distribute Klar Tale. It was to be released ad-free weekly, with additional editions released in braille writing and through audio casette. It was advertised as the "first easy read newspaper in Norway" for the "many Norwegians with reading disabilities". Nye Troms journalist Sverre Monssen described the issue as using short sentences with few difficult words, and described it as easy to understand where one article ended and where another began. The newspaper was based on similar initiatives in Sweden and Finland. Issues published in 1990 were to be released free-of-charge for those who paid for 1991 subscriptions.

Circulation
According to the Norwegian Media Businesses' Association, Klar Tale has had the following annual circulation:
 2006: 13,294
 2007: 13,090
 2008: 11,637
 2009: 12,472
 2010: 12,823
 2011: 12,228
 2012: 12,244
 2013: 12,021
 2014: 11,920
 2015: 10,978
 2016: 10,750

References

External links
Klar Tale homepage

Norwegian-language newspapers
Newspapers published in Oslo
Publications established in 1990
1990 establishments in Norway